Juan Sebastián Cabal and Robert Farah were the defending champions and successfully defended their title, defeating Santiago González and David Marrero in the final, 6–1, 6–4.

Seeds

Draw

Draw

References
 Main draw

Argentina Open - Doubles
ATP Buenos Aires